Santa Fe Snyder Corporation was an independent oil and gas exploration and production company headquartered in Houston, Texas. The company was formed by the 1999 merger of Houston-based Santa Fe Energy Resources and Fort Worth-based Snyder Oil Corporation. Santa Fe Snyder merged with Devon Energy in August 2000. Santa Fe Snyder was a publicly held company traded on the New York Stock Exchange under the ticker symbol SFS.

History 
On January 13, 1999, Snyder Oil Corporation and Santa Fe Energy Resources announced their intention to merge. The merger was completed on May 5, 1999.

Santa Fe Snyder was engaged in the exploration, development, acquisition and production of crude oil and natural gas in the U.S. and certain international areas. Its core U.S. areas were the Gulf of Mexico, the Permian Basin and the Rocky Mountains and its core international areas were Southeast Asia and South America. The company also had oil production and conducted some exploration operations, in West Africa.

As of December 31, 1999, Santa Fe Snyder reported annual revenue of $510.3 million, net proved reserves of 386.3 million barrels of oil equivalents, and 1,408 employees.

Merger with Devon Energy 
On May 26, 2000, Santa Fe Snyder and Devon Energy announced their intention to merge. The merger was completed three months later, making Devon Energy one of the top-five U.S.-based independent oil and gas producers in terms of market capitalization, total proved reserves and annual production.

References

External links

Santa Fe Snyder 10k

Companies based in Houston
Defunct oil companies of the United States
Defunct companies based in Texas